Push Play may refer to:

Push Play, American pop/rock band from Long Island, NY
Push Play (EP), a 2012 EP by Sara Niemietz
"Push Play" (song), a song by Zedd featuring Miriam Bryant

See also
Just Push Play, 2001 album by Aerosmith
"Just Push Play" (song), title track from above album
Just Push Play Tour, tour by Aerosmith to coincide with the album